Erdne Ombadykow (born 27 October 1972 in Philadelphia), also known as Telo Tulku Rinpoche, is the Tibetan Buddhist spiritual leader of the Kalmyk people. He received his formal training as a bhikṣu in India and was recognized by the 14th Dalai Lama as the current reincarnation of mahasiddha Tilopa.

Since 1992, Telo Tulku has served as the spiritual head (Shadjin Lama) of the Buddhists of Kalmykia. He divides his time between Kalmykia and his family in Erie, Colorado.

Early life and career
Erdne Ombadykow was born in Philadelphia to working class, immigrant parents of Kalmyk origin as the youngest of brothers Tschon, Tseren, Dava, Jigmid, Jaba and sisters Marguerite, Gerel and Rolma. As a child, Erdne determined that he wanted to be a Buddhist monk, the way other boys want to be policemen or firemen. By the age of seven, Erdne's parents permitted him to move to India where he would  study Buddhism at a monastery until 1992. It was reported on ChessBase News, when asked why was he was sent to a monastery in India to be trained as a Buddhist monk at age seven, he said his family wanted one of the sons to become a monk, and he had shown the greatest interest. In New York he met the 14th Dalai Lama of Tibet, who recommended that he go to the Drepung Gomang Monastery in South India for proper training. While studying at the Drepung Gomang Monastery for 13 years, Erdne Ombadykow was recognized as the current reincarnation (Tulku) of Tilopa, a revered Buddhist saint.

Initial visit to Russia 
After the collapse of the Soviet Union in 1992, Erdne joined the Dalai Lama on his first visit to Kalmykia, a region whose once-rich Buddhist heritage was destroyed in the 1930s by the dual Soviet policies of collectivization and atheism. Upon arrival, the Dalai Lama named Erdne as the Šajin (Supreme) Lama of the Kalmyk people. As the spiritual leader, Erdne's role was to lead a Buddhist revival among the approximately 160,000 Kalmyks who live in Kalmykia.

As the only Kalmyk person with proper Buddhist training, Erdne soon determined that his responsibility as the Šajin Lama was too great a burden for he himself to bear as a 22-year-old. Moreover, he found that his formal monastic training did not prepare him for the role he was assigned. He neither spoke the Kalmyk language nor was he familiar with the mentality of the people or the government.

Return to the USA 
Presumably these obstacles made him return to the United States in late 1994, renounce monkhood and get married in 1995. However, after a self-imposed two-year exile, Erdne re-embraced his mission and returned to Kalmykia.

Return to Kalmykia
Since his return to Kalmykia, Erdne has successfully led the revival of Buddhism. For example, as the Šajin Lama, Erdne now administers 27 newly constructed temples and prayer houses and oversees the work of seven Tibetan lamas. He also has dispatched dozens of young Kalmyk men to India for formal monastic training. Finally, he has learned to speak Kalmyk and Russian.

Erdne spends six months of the year in Elista and the remainder with his wife and son in the United States.

On 1 October 2022, Ombadykov left Russia to Mongolia and stated about the 2022 Russian invasion of Ukraine that the Ukrainians were in the moral right, and saw them as "defenders of their land". On 27 January 2023, Erdni Basan Ombadykov was recognized in Russia as a foreign agent.

See also
 Buddhism in Kalmykia

References

 An Ex-Telemarketer's Other Life as a Buddhist Saint. The New York Times, 12 June 2004
 From Kalmykia With Love. Philadelphia City Paper, 22 July 2004
 The Trials of Telo Rinpoche (1993), a documentary about Telo Rinpoche's early experiences in Kalmykia, made by Ritu Sarin and Tenzing Sonam for the BBC.

1972 births
Living people
American people of Kalmyk descent
Lamas
Tibetan Buddhist priests from Kalmykia
People from Philadelphia
Tibetan Buddhists from the United States
Representatives of Offices of Tibet
People listed in Russia as foreign agents